Jamovi (stylized in all lower-case as jamovi) is a free and open-source computer program for data analysis and performing statistical tests. The core developers of Jamovi are Jonathon Love, Damian Dropmann, and Ravi Selker who are developers for the JASP project.

Software 
Jamovi is an open source graphical user interface for the R programming language. It is used in statistical research, especially as a tool for ANOVA (analysis of variance) and to understand statistical inference. It also can be used for linear regression, mixed models and Bayesian models.

Data is entered into a spreadsheet interface that can be imported into Jamovi. The analyses produced by the software are automatically updated to reflect changes made to the raw data. The software includes a multinomial test to determine whether observed data differs from researchers' predictions.

Extendibility 
Users can modify the base program and extend its functionality using community created open source add-on modules. These modules are written in the R programming language and make use of the jmv and jmvtools libraries to create the interface and display code. Numerous modules exist and can be accessed in the curated library within jamovi. Over 40 modules have been created by the jamovi community and extend the functionality of the program. These additional analyses include agreement and reliability analyses mediation models, meta-analysis, power analysis, psychometrics, structural equation models, and survival analysis.

See also 

 Free statistical software

External links 
 Official website
 jamovi modules library

References 

Free statistical software
R (programming language)